Morek (also spelled Murik, Mork, or Murak) is a Syrian town located in the Suran Subdistrict in Hama District. According to the Syria Central Bureau of Statistics (CBS), Morek had a population of 14,307 in the 2004 census.

Morek is the center of the country's pistachio production. Through Morek, passes the M5 highway which connects Hama with Aleppo.

History
In 1838, its inhabitants were noted to be predominantly Sunni Muslims.

Syrian Civil War 
During the Syrian civil war the city was the sight of the Battle of Morek. By 2018 it was under the control of Hayat Tahrir al Sham and had become the sight of an important crossing point from rebel held areas into those held by the Syrian government. On August 12, 2018 the Syrian Arab Army closed that crossing in preparation for their assault on rebel held territory in the region. The Turkish government had also deployed special forces to Morek in preparation for the SAA's anticipated advance on the Idlib region. The anticipated advance was averted by a de-militarization agreement signed between Russia and Turkey in September 2018. By May 2019 a group called Jaysh al-Izza was stationed in the city and was refusing to allow Russian patrols within the demilitarized zone.

On 20 August, the Syrian Observatory for Human Rights reported that the rebel and Islamic factions including jihadi groups like a Hayat Tahrir al-Sham had completely withdrawn from Morek in the northern countryside of Hama. Turkish Foreign Minister Mevlüt Çavuşoğlu said that the Turkish troops were staying at the Turkish observation post in Morek.

Turkey withdrew from its base in Morek on 19 October 2020, and the town was soon captured by the Syrian Army.

References

Bibliography

 

Towns in Hama Governorate
Populated places in Hama District